Pir Yusefian (also Romanized as Pīr Yūsefīān and Pīr Yūsefīyān) is a village in Pir Yusefian Rural District, in the Central District of Alborz County, Qazvin Province, Iran. At the 2006 census, its population was 3,816, in 890 families.

References 

Populated places in Alborz County